Lee Trevor Nelson (born 5 December 1990) is an Irish cricketer. He made his Twenty20 cricket debut for Northern Knights in the 2017 Inter-Provincial Trophy on 26 May 2017. He made his first-class debut for Northern Knights in the 2017 Inter-Provincial Championship on 30 May 2017. He made his List A debut for Northern Knights in the 2017 Inter-Provincial Cup on 6 August 2017.

References

External links
 

1990 births
Living people
Irish cricketers
Northern Knights cricketers